Charles Ray Sharpe (born September 6, 1938) was an American politician in the state of South Carolina. He served in the South Carolina House of Representatives as a member of the Republican Party from 1985 to 2002, representing Aiken County, South Carolina. He resides in Wagener. He was a magazine publisher. Sharpe also served as South Carolina Agriculture Commissioner from 2002 to 2004. He resigned in 2004 after being indicted on charges of extortion, money laundering and lying to federal investigators, stemming from an illegal cockfighting ring. He served two years in prison.

References

1938 births
Living people
Republican Party members of the South Carolina House of Representatives
Businesspeople from South Carolina
People from Wagener, South Carolina
South Carolina politicians convicted of crimes